Láng is a surname of Manchu-Chinese origin. It is an ancient term to refer to one’s lover or son. According to a 2013 study, it is the 242nd most common surname, with around 370,000 or 0.028% of the total population having the name, and Hebei being the province with the most people sharing the name. It is the 48th name on the Hundred Family Surnames poem.

Origins
 Lang (郎) was the name of a city where Fei Bo (費伯), the grandson of Duke Yi of Lu lived. Some of his descendants later changed their original surname Fei to Lang (郎).
 the surname is also borne by some families from the state of the South Huns.

Additionally, during the Qing dynasty China, the Niohuru family of Manchu origin sinicized and changed their family name to Lang (郎), which sounded like "wolf" (狼, also Láng) in Mandarin Chinese, since "wolf" in the Manchu language was niohuru.

Notable people
Lang Jingshan, photographer
Lang Lang (born 1982), pianist
Lang Ping (born 1960), former volleyball player and coach
Lang Zheng (郎征; born 1986), footballer
Lang Shining (1688–1766), Chinese name of Giuseppe Castiglione, Italian Jesuit Brother
Lang Tzu-yun (郎祖筠; born 1965) is a Taiwanese actress
Lang Yongchun (郎永淳; born 1971) is a former Chinese news anchor best known for his work at China Central Television

References

Manchu people
Individual Chinese surnames